is a Japanese manga series by An Nakahara. The series ran in the shōjo manga magazine Ciao from March 2004 to June 2009, with side stories running in Pucchigumi in 2006. The manga sold a cumulative total of over 10 million copies and was awarded Best Children's Manga at the 2006 Shogakukan Manga Awards.

An anime adaptation premiered on April 7, 2006 in Japan on TV Tokyo and ran for 102 episodes until March 28, 2008. A second season with the subtitle  aired from April 8, 2008 to March 27, 2009 in high-definition and 3D animation. The anime series stars Morning Musume member Koharu Kusumi, and during the show's run, she released music and made appearances at concerts and crossover television shows as the character. Starting with Kirarin Revolution Stage 3, additional cast members joined her in music activities, such as MilkyWay and Ships.

Plot
Kirari Tsukishima, a 14-year-old beauty, does not care about idols and the entertainment world because her mind is occupied by food. One day, after saving a turtle stranded in a tree, Kirari meets a boy named Seiji, who gives her a ticket to a concert to show his gratitude for her saving his pet. However, when Kirari shows up at the concert, another boy named Hiroto, tears up her ticket and warns her to stay away from Seiji, because they both live in different worlds. Kirari learns that Seiji and Hiroto are members of the idol group Ships. Finally understanding the meaning of "different worlds", Kirari refuses to give up pursuing Seiji and declares that she will also become an idol. However, being an idol requires tons of training and talent. Faced with rivals and scandals, Kirari is determined to come out as a top idol.

Characters

Main characters
 

Kirari is a beautiful 14-year-old girl who strives to be an idol to become closer to Seiji. She has a huge appetite for food. Despite her shortcomings and lack of talents, she manages to persevere as a result of the help she receives from her friends and her unwavering resilience. As time passes and she spends time with Hiroto, she begins to fall in love with him instead.

Na-san is Kirari's cat who acts competent and intelligent. He provides a lot of help to Kirari and protects her from danger.

Hiroto is a member of boy band Ships. Hiroto acts honest and strict towards Kirari. Despite how he treats her, he falls in love with her. Although he supports Kirari's feelings for Seiji throughout the series, he often worries about her when she faces difficult situations and is usually the one who helps her out.

Seiji is a member of boy band Ships. He is gentle and air-headed, and Kirari compares him to a prince. He has a pet turtle named .

Stage 3 characters

Noel is an original character created for the anime and part of the idol unit MilkyWay. She is an athletic girl who loves playing sports. She is in love with her childhood friend, Cloudy. She owns a pet cat named , who used to be the leader of a gang in his cat town and joins Mi-chan and Na-san in their own idol unit, Triangle. 

Kobeni is an original character created for the anime and part of the idol unit MilkyWay. Kobeni is usually seen with a crystal ball. She owns a pet cat named , who used to live in luxury and joins Ni-kun and Na-san in their own idol unit, Triangle.

Recurring characters

Arashi is Kirari's childhood friend and an illusionist who moved to Osaka when they were six. He tries to get Kirari to quit the entertainment world so that she will fulfill their childhood promise of being his wife. He owns a pet cat named , who is Na-san's brother.

Erina is an idol who belongs to the same company as Kirari, yet views her Kirari as a rival and manipulates others in order to interfere with Kirari's progress. She attends the same school as Kirari, and formerly held the position of princess in her class' popularity ranks before Kirari transferred. She has a pet dog named .

Fubuki is a former model who transitioned into being an idol. She first dismisses Kirari, but she later regards her as a worthy friend and rival. Because Fubuki comes from a wealthy family and has experienced fame since childhood, she is viewed as spoiled and confidant. She owns a pet cat named , who is Na-san and Na-yan's brother, and a pet chick named , who has great physical strength.
 / 

Izumi is an idol working in the same company as Fubuki and views Kirari a rival for Hiroto's feelings, manipulating staff members and the media in order to keep Kirari away from him. Izumi's identity is revealed as Hiroto's childhood friend, Hyotaro, who had become an idol disguised as a girl after they had both promised each other to become idols as children. He owns a pet cat named , who wears glasses and has a crush on Na-san.

Cloudy is a new idol working for the Higashiyama Company. He flirts with Kirari as part of the company's orders to sabotage Kirari's career, but he soon falls in love with her for real and eventually quits his company. He apologizes Kirari for sabotaging her so much to the point where she couldn't take it. He also says that he will return to someone's fan and support Kirari as an idol.

Aoi is an original character created for the anime. Dubbed the "idol queen", she is a popular idol. She acts very kind and helpful, and is Nojo's 15th top idol winner. Aoi graduates from being an idol and travels around the world pursuing a new career in music, but she and Kirari remain good friends.

Hikaru is an original character created for the anime. She is an idol trainee who Kirari mentors and forms the idol unit Kira Pika with her. At first, she acts rude towards Kirari, considering her as some sort of fool. However, she starts to respect her as she teaches her important lessons and helps her out whenever she struggles. The two eventually become close friends and Hikaru thanks Kirari for all her help at last. Afterwards, Hikaru continues her career as a solo singer after their last concert as Kira Pika ends.

Family members

Takashi is Kirari's doting father who brought up Kirari by himself. Although he is an easygoing person, he initially opposes the idea of Kirari becoming an idol, but he begins to support her after seeing how serious she is about her career.

Subaru is Kirari's brother who resides in America with the hope of having his own idol debut and currently studies acting in New York. He owns a pet cat named , who he found at Fifth Avenue.

Kirari's grandmother is an original character created for the anime. She encourages Kirari to be an idol since she is a secret fan of Ships, particularly Hiroto.
 / 
Luna is an original character created for the anime. She is Kirari's mother and a famous actress under the stage name . She asks Kirari to go to Hollywood with her but Kirari refuses and decides to remain in Japan, continuing to be an idol.

Managers and producers

Muranishi is the chairman of the company that Kirari and Ships belong to. He recognizes the potential that Kirari possesses and makes a lot of arrangements before and after she becomes an idol. He owns a pet mouse named , who is the director of the company and chooses the idols' jobs.

Kumoi is an original character created for the anime, but she appeared in the manga beginning in volume 9. She is Kirari's manager and was previously an idol under the name . Although externally a serious and humorless person, she is actually pleased by Kirari's willingness to do her best in every situation.

Shakujii is Erina's subservient manager, who tries to fulfill Erina's every request.

Mr. Kama is an original character created for the anime. He is Kirari and Ships' songwriter.

Higashiyama is the chairman of the Higanshiyama Company with a crush on Muranishi. Originally, she attempts to sabotage Kirari's career, but after her best stars quit and Muranishi gets upset, she concentrates on making top quality stars instead. She owns a pet alligator named .

Media

Manga
Kirarin Revolution was serialized in the monthly magazine Ciao from the March 2004 issue to the June 2009 issue. The chapters were later released in bound volumes by Shogakukan under the "Ciao Comics" imprint. A total of 14 volumes have been released. Originally, Nakahara planned Kirari's name to be "Konomi Hazuki" and Hiroto's last name to be "Tsukishima."

Anime

Kirarin Revolution was adapted into an anime series by SynergySP and G&G Entertainment in 2006. It aired on TV Tokyo from April 7, 2006 to March 27, 2008 for a total of 102 episodes. Koharu Kusumi from Morning Musume was cast as Kirari. Kusumi also performed the opening and ending theme songs, as well as releasing music under Kirari Tsukishima's name. Kusumi noted in her autobiography, 17-sai no Tenshoku, that the anime was originally supposed to last for one year, but due to the success of the show, it was renewed for two more broadcast years.

After the show's third renewal, Kirarin Revolution broadcast its second season with the subtitle Kirarin Revolution Stage 3. The show aired on TV Tokyo from April 8, 2008 to March 27, 2009, for a total of 51 episodes. It was animated by SynergySP and SimImage in 3D animation and HD format. Noel Yukino and Kobeni Hanasaki, new original characters played by Sayaka Kitahara and You Kikkawa from Hello Pro Egg, were added to the main cast. Takuya Ide and Shikou Kanai were cast as the new actors for Ships members Hiroto and Seiji.

In addition to providing the voice to Kirari, Kusumi made crossover appearances at concerts and television shows as her character, including being a recurring guest on Haromoni and Oha Suta, which made her one of the pioneers of the "idol voice actor" crossover beginning in the late 2000s. For the summer of 2007, Mai Hagiwara from Cute was cast as an anime-original character, Hikaru Mizuki, and became part of an anime-original idol subunit Kira Pika with Kusumi for a short story arc, releasing music and making in-character appearances on other television shows on TV Tokyo. During Kirarin Revolution Stage 3'''s run, the show's new format launched a singing career for new cast and allowed crossover appearances on other television shows as their characters. On April 4, 2008, Ide and Kanai appeared on Oha Suta as their characters for the first time and also had their own in-character segment on the show on Thursdays from April 10, 2008 to May 4, 2009.

In 2007, Viz Media Europe licensed the anime for European release under the title Kilari!Live-action TV series

Short live-action drama episodes were aired on Oha Suta, with small segments aired over several days. The cast from the anime series reprised their roles.

Video games
Several video games produced by Konami were released for the Nintendo DS during the show's run. All six games sold a cumulative total of 650,000 copies.

Trading card game

Atlus released a set of trading cards for the series that were compatible with the Kirarin Revolution arcade games available from November 28, 2006 to July 2009. The first set was titled . The second, released in 2008, was titled . Along with Takara Tomy's paper doll Millefeui Cards, the Kuru Kira Idol Days cards sold a combined total of 50 million pieces.

ReceptionKirarin Revolution has sold a cumulative total of over 10 million physical copies. It won the 2006 Shogakukan Manga Award for children's manga.Oricon notes that while actors releasing music as their characters have been notable, Kusumi portraying Kirari Tsukishima in voice and in a real-world context pioneered the "idol voice actor" crossover beginning in the late 2000s, along with Aya Hirano from the Haruhi Suzumiya series. Parallels have been drawn between Kusumi and Kirari, citing their similarities in age, career, and process of becoming an idol, which led Kusumi to be closely associated with the character. In the week of December 24–30, 2007, the Kirarin Revolution anime series had an average viewership rating of 2.6%. Kusumi was named #17 in Daitan Map's "Top 50 Voice Actors of Popular Characters" in 2007 for her role as Kirari.

On his review of the first volume, Carlo Santos from Anime News Network highlighted the focus on friendship, the story's light-hearted tone, and clean artwork as attractive to young readers; at the same time, Santos mentions the story presents a wish fulfillment fantasy and advises critics of the idol industry to "avoid the series entirely." Kirarin Revolution was ranked #6 on Anime News Network'''s list of "6 Idols that Fandom Forgot", with Lynzee Loveridge stating that despite the series' long run, it failed to attract an audience outside of its target demographic and was quickly forgotten after its end.

Notes

References

External links 
Kirarin Revolution Official web site - Japan 
 TV Tokyo Kirarin Revolution Official Homepage - Japan 
 
Konami's Kirarin Revolution-Nintendo Konami video game profile - 2008April 1st 

 
2004 manga
Animated musical groups
Children's manga
2006 anime television series debuts
Japanese children's animated comedy television series
Japanese idols in anime and manga
Romantic comedy anime and manga
Shogakukan manga
Shōjo manga
TV Tokyo original programming
TVB
Video games featuring female protagonists
Viz Media anime
Winners of the Shogakukan Manga Award for children's manga
Magical girl anime and manga